Thoughtcrime is a word coined by George Orwell in his 1949 dystopian novel Nineteen Eighty-Four. It  describes a person's politically unorthodox thoughts, such as beliefs and doubts that contradict the tenets of Ingsoc (English Socialism), the dominant ideology of Oceania. In the official language of Newspeak, the word crimethink describes the intellectual actions of a person who entertains and holds politically unacceptable thoughts; thus the government of the Party controls the speech, the actions, and the thoughts of the citizens of Oceania. In contemporary English usage, the word thoughtcrime describes beliefs that are contrary to accepted norms of society, and is used to describe theological concepts, such as disbelief and idolatry, and the rejection of an ideology.

Thought control

In the story of Nineteen Eighty-Four, the Thinkpol (Thought Police) are responsible for the detection and elimination of thoughtcrime, and for the social control of the populations of Oceania, by way of audio-visual surveillance and offender profiling. Such psychological monitoring allows the Thought Police to detect, arrest, and kill thought criminals, citizens whose independence (intellectual, mental, and moral) challenges the political orthodoxy of Ingsoc (English Socialism) and thus the legitimate government authority of the Party. In the detection of thoughtcrime—and to overcome the physical impossibility of simultaneously policing every citizen of Oceania—the Thinkpol spy upon the populace through ubiquitous two-way telescreens, and so can monitor any person's body language, reflexive speech, and facial expressions:

The universal, physical presence of the telescreen, in public and in private spaces, exerted psychological pressure upon each citizen of Oceania to presume that they were under constant Thinkpol surveillance, and thus in danger of detection and arrest as a thought criminal; thus, whenever near a telescreen, Winston Smith was always mindful of that possibility: "If you made unexpected movements, they yelled at you from the telescreen." Such surveillance methods allowed the Thinkpol and the Ministry of Love (Miniluv) to become universally feared by the citizens of Oceania, especially by the members of the Outer Party, which includes Winston Smith.

Crimestop
In the Newspeak vocabulary, the word crimestop denotes the citizens' self-awareness to immediately rid themselves of unwanted, incorrect  thoughts (personal and political), the discovery of which, by the Thinkpol, would lead to detection and arrest, transport to and interrogation at the Miniluv (Ministry of Love). The protagonist, Winston Smith, describes crimestop as a conscious process of self-imposed cognitive dissonance:

Moreover, from the perspective of Oceania's principal enemy of the state, in the history book The Theory and Practice of Oligarchical Collectivism, Emmanuel Goldstein said that:

See also 
 Censorship
 Freedom of thought
 Internal sin
 Mens rea
 Pre-crime
 Secret police
 Thought Police

References

Further reading 
 .
 

Fictional elements introduced in 1949
1940s neologisms
Nineteen Eighty-Four
Words originating in fiction
Authoritarianism
Political terminology
Linguistic controversies